Profundiconus tuberculosus is a species of sea snail, a marine gastropod mollusk in the family Conidae, the cone snails and their allies.

Profundiconus tuberculosus was believed to be extinct, and thus it is often represented with a dagger "†" as a fossil species.  Mike Filmer (2011) notes in Nomenclature and Taxonomy in Living Conidae that living specimens have been found, citing Toki, 1937.

Like all species within the genus Profundiconus, these cone snails are predatory and venomous. They are capable of "stinging" humans, therefore live ones should be handled carefully or not at all.

Description
The size of the shell varies between 14 mm and 30 mm.

Distribution
This marine species occurs in Sagami Bay, Japan and in the China Sea; in the Pacific Ocean off the Tarava Seamounts, off Tahiti.

References

 Tucker J.K. & Tenorio M.J. (2013) Illustrated catalog of the living cone shells. 517 pp. Wellington, Florida: MdM Publishing.

External links
 The Conus Biodiversity website
 
 Mike Filmer (2011) Nomenclature and Taxonomy in Living Conidae Section T, published in The Cone Collector, at: http://www.theconecollector.com/lib/docs/filmer/T.pdf

tuberculosus
Gastropods described in 1937